The Palacio de Gobierno, or the Government Palace of Nuevo León, is a state government building in Monterrey, the capital city of Nuevo León state, in northern Mexico.

The Neoclassical style building is located in the northernmost section of the Macroplaza in the city.

The Palacio de Gobierno is the location of the office of the Governor of Nuevo León.

See also

Palacio de Gobierno
Government buildings in Mexico
Landmarks in Monterrey
National Monuments of Mexico
Palaces in Mexico
Neoclassical architecture in Mexico
History museums in Mexico